Adolphe Bloch (1882–1969) was a 20th-century French biological and racialist anthropologist as well as a Turkologist, and member of the Society of Anthropology of Paris.

He was particularly interested in the Osmanlis.

Bibliography 
1898: Les invasions barbares. Une généalogie de l'histoire de l'art

External links 
 List of publications on Persée

French anthropologists
Turkologists
1882 births
1969 deaths
20th-century anthropologists